Gay Parent is a North American bi-monthly lifestyle and news publication which targets the gay and lesbian parenting community. The magazine publishes articles on international and domestic adoption, foster care, donor insemination and surrogacy.

History and profile
The first issue was published in November 1998. That same year in September the magazine launched a website. The magazine has featured State Senator Jarrett Barrios; writer and performer Susie Bright and sex advice columnist and author Dan Savage.

The headquarters of Gay Parent is in Forest Hills, New York.

References

External links 
 Official magazine website

Bimonthly magazines published in the United States
LGBT-related magazines published in the United States
Lifestyle magazines published in the United States
Magazines established in 1998
Magazines published in New York (state)
Parenting magazines